Lysapsus limellum, sometimes known as the Uruguay harlequin frog,  is a species of frog in the family Hylidae found in northern Argentina, Bolivia, Brazil, Paraguay, and Uruguay. Its natural habitats are moist savanna, subtropical or tropical seasonally wet or flooded lowland grassland, rivers, swamps, freshwater lakes, freshwater marshes, and pastureland. It is locally impacted by habitat loss.

References

Lysapsus
Amphibians of Argentina
Amphibians of Bolivia
Amphibians of Brazil
Amphibians of Paraguay
Amphibians of Uruguay
Amphibians described in 1862
Taxonomy articles created by Polbot